Frederick Richard Vaughan Timbury (12 July 1885 – 14 April 1945) was a rugby union player who represented Australia.

Timbury, a lock, was born in Gladstone, Queensland and claimed a total of 2 international rugby caps for Australia.

He also represented Queensland at cricket and tennis. A fast bowler, he played six first-class matches for Queensland, taking 14 wickets.

He became a solicitor, and was an outspoken advocate for water diversion irrigation for western Queensland. He was mayor of Roma when he died in 1945.

References

Australian rugby union players
Australia international rugby union players
1885 births
1945 deaths
Queensland cricketers
Rugby union players from Queensland
Rugby union locks